John "Machine" Lober (born February 26, 1968) is an American mixed martial artist who competes in the Light Heavyweight division. He lost his last fight at Cage Wars Championship: Nightmare against Lee McKibbin on November 29, 2009. Lober holds a notable victory over Frank Shamrock and also has cornered and trained with UFC Hall of Famer and former UFC Light Heavyweight Champion Tito Ortiz.

Mixed martial arts record

|-
| Loss
| align=center| 5–9–4
| Lee McKibbin
| Submission (guillotine choke)
| Cage Wars: Nightmare
| 
| align=center| 1
| align=center| 0:43
| Belfast, Northern Ireland
| 
|-
| Loss
| align=center| 5–8–4
| Rubin Tagle
| KO
| KOTC: Final Chapter
| 
| align=center| 1
| align=center| 0:10
| California, United States
| 
|-
| Win
| align=center| 5–7–4
| Damien Gomez
| TKO
| KOTC: Point of No Return
| 
| align=center| 1
| align=center| 3:20
| California, United States
| 
|-
| Loss
| align=center| 4–7–4
| Marcelo Tigre
| Submission (armbar)
| Extreme Wars 2 – X-1
| 
| align=center| 1
| align=center| 1:37
| Hawaii, United States
| 
|-
| Draw
| align=center| 4–6–4
| Kazuo Takahashi
| Draw
| Pancrase - Breakthrough 6
| 
| align=center| 2
| align=center| 3:00
| Tokyo, Japan
| 
|-
| Draw
| align=center| 4–6–3
| Kengo Watanabe
| Draw
| Pancrase – Advance 12
| 
| align=center| 1
| align=center| 15:00
| Tokyo, Japan
| 
|-
| Win
| align=center| 4–6–2
| Izzy Johnson
| Submission (choke)
| WCNHBC – West Coast NHB Championships 1
| 
| align=center| 1
| align=center| 3:25
| 
| 
|-
| Loss
| align=center| 3–6–2
| Frank Shamrock
| TKO (submission to punches)
| UFC Brazil
| 
| align=center| 1
| align=center| 7:40
| Brazil
| 
|-
| Loss
| align=center| 3–5–2
| Joe Pardo
| Decision
| NG 6  – Neutral Grounds 6
| 
| align=center| 1
| align=center| 11:00
| 
| 
|-
| Loss
| align=center| 3–4–2
| Minoru Suzuki
| Decision (lost points)
| Pancrase - Advance 7
| 
| align=center| 1
| align=center| 15:00
| Tokyo, Japan
| 
|-
| Loss
| align=center| 3–3–2
| Ryushi Yanagisawa
| TKO (broken ankle)
| Pancrase: Alive 11
| 
| align=center| 1
| align=center| 0:55
| Yokohama, Japan
| 
|-
| Draw
| align=center| 3–2–2
| Osami Shibuya
| Draw
| Pancrase: Alive 9
| 
| align=center| 1
| align=center| 15:00
| Tokyo, Japan
| 
|-
| Loss
| align=center| 3–2–1
| Kiuma Kunioku
| Decision (lost points)
| Pancrase: 1997 Anniversary Show
| 
| align=center| 1
| align=center| 10:00
| Tokyo, Japan
| 
|-
| Loss
| align=center| 3–1–1
| Kevin Jackson
| Submission
| EF 4 – Extreme Fighting 4
| 
| align=center| 2
| align=center| 1:12
| Iowa, United States
| 
|-
| Win
| align=center| 3–0–1
| Frank Shamrock
| Decision (split)
| SB 3 – SuperBrawl 3
| 
| align=center| 1
| align=center| 30:00
| Hawaii, United States
| 
|-
| Draw
| align=center| 2–0–1
| Igor Zinoviev
| Draw
| EF 3 – Extreme Fighting 3
| 
| align=center| 3
| align=center| 5:00
| Oklahoma, United States
| 
|-
| Win
| align=center| 2–0
| Jamie Faucett
| Submission (heel hook)
| IFC 2 – Mayhem in Mississippi
| 
| align=center| 1
| align=center| 0:39
| Mississippi, United States
| 
|-
| Win
| align=center| 1–0
| Eric Heberstreit
| Submission (rear naked choke)
| IFC 1 – Kombat in Kiev
| 
| align=center| 1
| align=center| 3:39
| Ukraine
|

References

External links
 
 

1968 births
American male mixed martial artists
Light heavyweight mixed martial artists
Mixed martial artists utilizing Jeet Kune Do
Living people
American Jeet Kune Do practitioners
Mixed martial artists from California
Sportspeople from Huntington Beach, California
Ultimate Fighting Championship male fighters